Kimmins is an unincorporated community in northern Lewis County, Tennessee. It lies along local roads north of the city of Hohenwald, the county seat of Lewis County.  Its elevation is 951 feet (290 m).

References

Unincorporated communities in Lewis County, Tennessee
Unincorporated communities in Tennessee